Mohammed Shreidi (c. 1986 – February 11, 2004) was the youngest son of Sheik Hisham Shreidi founder of Osbat al-Ansar.  After the killings of his father in 1991 and his older brother, Abdullah Shreidi in 2003 by the al-Fatah militia in Ain al-Hilweh.  Shreidi attempted to lead Asbat al-Nour when he was 18 years old.  On February 11, 2004 Mohhamed Shreidi was killed by al-Fatah gunmen.

References

2004 deaths
1984 births
Salafi jihadists